A regional election was held in Madeira on 9 October 2011, to determine the composition of the Legislative Assembly of the Autonomous Region of Madeira. In the election, the Social Democratic Party, led by Alberto João Jardim, who has been in power since 1978, archived, once again, an absolute majority.

The campaign for the regional legislative election in Madeira ran from 25 September to 7 October 2011.

The election was marked by the discovery of a "financial hole" in the accounts of the Regional Government, which may have influenced the election results. In fact, the PSD obtained its worst result ever in a regional election (48.56%), resulting in the loss of eight deputies in relation to the regional elections of 2007. The CDS–PP grew from 5% to 17.6% and from 4th most voted party to second most voted party, a result that was considered historical by party leader Paulo Portas.

The CDS–PP and PS-Madeira claimed that there were irregularities in the election, specifically because of the transportation of voters to the polls with vehicles of various public bodies which led to the formalization of a complaint to the National Elections Commission (CNE).

Electoral system
The 47 members of the Madeiran regional parliament are elected in a single constituency by proportional representation under the D'Hondt method, coinciding with the territory of the Region.

Parties
The parties that partook in the election, and their leaders, were:

 Left Bloc (BE), Roberto Carlos de Almada
 Unitary Democratic Coalition (CDU), Edgar Silva
 Earth Party (MPT), João Gonçalves
 Party for Animals and Nature (PAN), Rui Almeida
 New Democracy Party (PND), Hélder Spínola de Freitas
 Socialist Party (PS), Maximiano Martins
 Social Democratic Party (PPD/PSD), Alberto João Jardim
 People's Party (CDS–PP), José Manuel Rodrigues
 Portuguese Labour Party (PTP), José Manuel Coelho

Opinion polling

Summary of votes and seats

|-
! rowspan="2" colspan=2 style="background-color:#E9E9E9" align=left|Parties
! rowspan="2" style="background-color:#E9E9E9" align=right|Votes
! rowspan="2" style="background-color:#E9E9E9" align=right|%
! rowspan="2" style="background-color:#E9E9E9" align=right|±pp swing
! colspan="5" style="background-color:#E9E9E9" align="center"|MPs
! rowspan="2" style="background-color:#E9E9E9;text-align:right;" |MPs %/votes %
|- style="background-color:#E9E9E9"
! style="background-color:#E9E9E9;text-align=center|2007
! style="background-color:#E9E9E9;text-align=center|2011
! style="background-color:#E9E9E9" align=right|±
! style="background-color:#E9E9E9" align=right|%
! style="background-color:#E9E9E9" align=right|±
|-
| 
|71,561||48.57||15.7||33||25||8||53.19||17.0||1.10
|-
| 
|25,975||17.63||12.3||2||9||7||19.15||14.8||1.09
|-
| 
|16,942||11.50||3.9||7||6||1||12.77||2.1||1.11
|-
|style="width: 10px" bgcolor=#CC0033 align="center" | 
|align=left|Labour
|10,115||6.87||||||3||||6.38||||0.93
|-
| 
|5,546||3.76||3.8||2||1||1||2.13||2.1||0.57
|-
| 
|4,825||3.27||1.2||1||1||0||2.13||0.0||0.65
|-
|style="width: 10px" bgcolor=teal align="center" | 
|align=left|Party for Animals and Nature
|3,134||2.13||||||1||||2.13||||1.00
|-
| 
|2,839||1.93||0.3||1||1||0||2.13||0.0||1.10
|-
| 
|2,512||1.70||1.3||1||0||1||0.00||2.1||0.0
|-
|colspan=2 align=left style="background-color:#E9E9E9"|Total valid
|width="50" align="right" style="background-color:#E9E9E9"|143,449
|width="40" align="right" style="background-color:#E9E9E9"|97.36
|width="40" align="right" style="background-color:#E9E9E9"|0.4
|width="40" align="right" style="background-color:#E9E9E9"|47
|width="40" align="right" style="background-color:#E9E9E9"|47
|width="40" align="right" style="background-color:#E9E9E9"|0
|width="40" align="right" style="background-color:#E9E9E9"|100.00
|width="40" align="right" style="background-color:#E9E9E9"|0.0
|width="40" align="right" style="background-color:#E9E9E9"|—
|-
|colspan=2|Blank ballots
|1,088||0.74||0.1||colspan=6 rowspan=4|
|-
|colspan=2|Invalid ballots
|2,800||1.90||0.5
|-
|colspan=2 align=left style="background-color:#E9E9E9"|Total
|width="50" align="right" style="background-color:#E9E9E9"|147,337
|width="40" align="right" style="background-color:#E9E9E9"|100.00
|width="40" align="right" style="background-color:#E9E9E9"|
|-
|colspan=2|Registered voters/turnout
||256,755||57.38||3.4
|-
| colspan=11 align=left | Source: Comissão Nacional de Eleições
|}

See also
Madeira

References

External links
Election results
Comissão Nacional de Eleições

2011 elections in Portugal
2011